James Beattie Scott (born 27 November 1978) is an English former first-class cricketer.

Scott was born at Hammersmith in November 1978 and was educated at Radley College, before going up to Downing College, Cambridge. While studying at Cambridge he made four appearances in first-class cricket in 2001, playing three times for Cambridge UCCE, including in the sides inaugural first-class match against Kent, in addition to playing for Cambridge University against Oxford University in The University Match at Fenner's. Playing as a left-arm medium-fast bowler, he took 4 wickets in his four matches at a high average of 80.00 and with best figures of 1 for 33.

Notes and references

External links

1978 births
Living people
People from Hammersmith
People educated at Radley College
Alumni of Downing College, Cambridge
English cricketers
Cambridge MCCU cricketers
Cambridge University cricketers